Cory Ross (born September 22, 1982) is a former American football, Canadian football and indoor football running back. He is now the head coach of the Quad City Steamwheelers of the Indoor Football League (IFL). He most recently played for the Edmonton Eskimos of the Canadian Football League. He was signed by the Baltimore Ravens as an undrafted free agent in 2006. He played college football at Nebraska.

Early years
Ross attended Thomas Jefferson High School in Denver, Colorado. While in high school, Ross played in the first ever U.S. Army All-American Bowl game on December 30, 2000 alongside fellow Nebraska Cornhusker Titus Adams.

College career
Ross played college football at Nebraska, where he earned the nickname "Porkchop" because he was significantly heavy for his small stature, weighing more than fellow I-backs who were all at least 5 inches taller. His 2,743 rushing yards ranked ninth on the team's all-time list. He majored in sociology.

Professional career

Baltimore Ravens
Ross signed with the Baltimore Ravens as an undrafted rookie free agent on May 12, 2006. In his rookie season he played in four games. With the injury to B.J. Sams during the 2006 NFL season, Ross became the kick returner for the Baltimore Ravens. He made his NFL debut on December 10 at the Kansas City Chiefs.

In the Ravens' 2007 season finale, Ross rushed for 78 yards and a touchdown against the Pittsburgh Steelers. He was released prior to the 2008 season.

Sacramento Mountain Lions
After spending the 2008 season out of football, Ross was signed by the California Redwoods of the United Football League on August 18, 2009. For the 2010 season, the Redwoods relocated to Sacramento and were renamed the Sacramento Mountain Lions.

He was named the 2010 UFL Offensive Season MVP.

Edmonton Eskimos
On May 17, 2012, Ross was signed by the Edmonton Eskimos, but was released during training camp on June 17, 2012.

Omaha Beef
In early January 2015, Ross joined the Omaha Beef of Champions Indoor Football as the team's new head coach.

Quad City Steamwheelers
On August 16, 2017, Ross was announced as the inaugural head coach of the revived Quad City Steamwheelers that began play in Champions Indoor Football for the 2018 season. The Steamwheelers joined the Indoor Football League for the 2019 season.

References

External links
Just Sports Stats
Nebraska Cornhuskers bio

1982 births
Living people
American football return specialists
American football running backs
Baltimore Ravens players
Sacramento Mountain Lions players
Edmonton Elks players
Nebraska Cornhuskers football players
Sportspeople from Denver
Players of American football from Denver
Lincoln Haymakers players
Champions Indoor Football coaches